The men's flyweight event was part of the boxing programme at the 1952 Summer Olympics.  The weight class was the lightest contested, and allowed boxers of up to 51 kilograms. The competition was held from 28 July to 2 August 1952. 27 boxers from 27 nations competed.

Medalists

Results

References

Flyweight